Kevin Ashley (6 July 1941 – 24 January 2013) was an Australian professional rugby league player. Primarily a second-row forward, he also played at hooker. He made 107 appearances for the Eastern Suburbs between 1963 and 1969, scoring five tries, converting 48 goals and scoring a club record 25 field goals. In 1967, the Paddington-raised Ashley represented NSW City Firsts against Country.

Ashley died on 24 January 2013 at the age of 71.

References

1941 births
2013 deaths
Australian rugby league players
City New South Wales rugby league team players
Rugby league players from Sydney
Sydney Roosters players